The Atom Ant/Secret Squirrel Show is an hour-long Saturday morning cartoon produced by Hanna-Barbera Productions from 1965 to 1967 for NBC.

In fall 1965, the show aired as two independent half-hour programs. The Atom Ant Show featured the tiny superhero Atom Ant, with additional segments Precious Pupp and The Hillbilly Bears. The Secret Squirrel Show featured the master spy Secret Squirrel, backed up with Squiddly Diddly and Winsome Witch. In the winter, the shows combine into an hour-long format, The Atom Ant/Secret Squirrel Show. For the series' final NBC run under the Atom Ant/Secret Squirrel title, the show was one half-hour long.

Production
On September 12, 1965, the series had an hour-long primetime preview on NBC called The World of Secret Squirrel and Atom Ant or The World of Atom Ant and Secret Squirrel.

The Hillbilly Bears cartoon segments were later repeated during the second season of The Banana Splits Adventure Hour (1969–1970), and all 52 Atom Ant and Secret Squirrel half-hour episodes were syndicated as part of The Banana Splits and Friends Show, an umbrella title for a package combining episodes of several different Hanna-Barbera series (the other series included The Banana Splits Adventure Hour, The New Adventures of Huckleberry Finn and The Adventures of Gulliver).

Segments
The program contained six segments:

 Atom Ant: A cartoon about a superheroic ant (voiced by Howard Morris). When he flew, he used his catchphrase "Up and at'em, Atom Ant!"
 The Hillbilly Bears: A situation comedy (inspired by The Beverly Hillbillies) about the Rugg family of hillbilly bears consisting of Paw Rugg (voiced by Henry Corden), Maw Rugg (voiced by Jean Vander Pyl), Floral Rugg (also voiced by Jean Vander Pyl), and Shag Rugg (voiced by Don Messick).
 Precious Pupp: A cartoon about a dog (voiced by Don Messick) and his elderly lady mistress Granny Sweet (voiced by Janet Waldo). He is characterized by a sneaky, wheezy laugh, making him a possible precursor to Muttley from 1968's Wacky Races and one of its two spin-offs, 1969's Dastardly and Muttley in Their Flying Machines.
 Secret Squirrel: The adventures of a secret agent squirrel (voiced by Mel Blanc) and his trusty assistant Morocco Mole (voiced by Paul Frees).
 Squiddly Diddly: A cartoon about a friendly anthropomorphic squid (voiced by Paul Frees) in his quest for stardom while trying to avoid being foiled by Chief Winchley (voiced by John Stephenson).
 Winsome Witch: A cartoon about a friendly, yet somewhat inept, witch named Winsome W. Witch (the "W" stood for Wacky) (voiced by Jean Vander Pyl). Winnie's catchphrase when casting a spell was "Ippity - Pippity - Pow!".

See also 
 List of works produced by Hanna-Barbera Productions
 List of Hanna-Barbera characters
 Secret Squirrel

References

External links 
 

Television series by Hanna-Barbera
Television series by Screen Gems
Television series by Sony Pictures Television
Television series by Warner Bros. Television Studios
1960s American animated television series
1960s American anthology television series
1965 American television series debuts
1967 American television series endings
NBC original programming
Animated television series about insects
Animated television series about squirrels
American children's animated action television series
American children's animated adventure television series
American children's animated anthology television series
American children's animated comedy television series
American children's animated superhero television series
English-language television shows